Deepto TV is a Bangladeshi Bengali-language satellite and cable television channel, owned and operated by Kazi Media Limited, a subsidiary of Kazi Farms Group. It officially began broadcasts on 18 November 2015, and within two weeks became the most watched television channel in Bangladesh. Its programming mostly consist of entertainment with emphasis on daily drama series. Deepto also broadcasts foreign programming, mainly Turkish drama series.

History
In December 2011, the Bangladesh Telecommunication Regulatory Commission granted "Deepto Bangla TV" a license to broadcast. The channel commenced transmissions as Deepto TV on 18 November 2015, and later aired the first and second episodes of Turkish drama series Muhteşem Yüzyıl, which helped with the channel's skyrocketing viewership. Muhteşem Yüzyıl was ranked the second highest among television series watched in the country by the first week of January 2016, and the channel itself was ranked highest among television channels in Bangladesh in terms of television ratings. Other than that, its local productions, which are Aparajita, Palki, Khujey Firi Takey, also gained initial success. The channel also broadcast Cartoon Network's Ben 10 and The Powerpuff Girls from its launch. In observance of the Martyred Intellectuals Day on 14 December 2015, Deepto TV produced and subsequently broadcast Amra Tomader Bhulini, a documentary on the life of martyred journalist Serajuddin Hossain.

On 7 June 2016, agriculture-related television series Deepto Krishi began airing on the channel. In December 2016, Bangladeshi television professionals demanded Deepto TV and three other local television channels to take dubbed foreign television series, which have gained popularity in the country, off their schedules. On 22 February 2017, American-French television series Highlander premiered on Deepto TV. On 19 May 2019, Deepto TV, along with five other channels, began broadcasting via the Bangabandhu-1 satellite after signing an agreement with BSCL. Three new drama series, Bhalobashar Alo-Andhar, Khalnayak, and Maan Obhimaan, debuted on Deepto TV on 26 October 2019. On 29 November 2019, Tomorrow, an animated film regarding climate change, had its world premiere on Deepto TV.

On 16 April 2020, Deepto TV halted news broadcasts for two weeks after four journalists working for the channel have contracted the COVID-19 disease. According to TRP reports during Eid al-Fitr in 2020, Deepto TV was ranked second highest among television channels in Bangladesh, only behind RTV. On 11 July 2020, Deepto TV premiered Turkish drama series Kadın, with its title being localized as Bahar, which had regularly topped the list of the most watched television programs in Bangladesh. In November 2020, Deepto TV began airing the Turkish drama Adını Feriha Koydum and local drama Mashrafi Junior.

On 18 November 2021, coinciding its sixth anniversary, Deepto TV began handing out the Deepto Awards. Deepto TV won the Best Use of Social Media award at the Bangladesh Media Innovation Awards 2022 held in September 2022. The channel inaugurated its own over-the-top platform, which is named Deepto Play, on 28 November 2022.

Programming
Apart from foreign programming, all of the programming on Deepto TV are produced by Kazi Media Limited.

Original programming
 Agun Pakhi
 Aparajita, based on the novel Baluchori written by Ashapoorna Devi (daily drama serial)
 Bhalobashar Alo-Andhar
 Deepto Award
 Deepto Chhayachobi
 Deepto Krishi - documentary on farmers and the role farming plays in their lives.
 Deepto Provati (daily musical morning show)
 Deepto Shangbad (news)
 Drishshopot - talk show on academic topics, hosted by Firoz Ahmed
 Khalnayak
 Khujey Firi Takey (daily drama serial)
 Maan Obhimaan (daily drama serial) - 1150 episodes
 Mashrafi Junior
 Palki
 Tokkatokki - talk show on topics and burning issues of the day, hosted by Robaet Ferdous

Acquired programming
 Adını Feriha Koydum  (Bengali dubbed drama series, title localized as Feriha; shown daily)
 Ben 10
 Bizim Hikaye (title localized as Amader Golpo)
 Elif
 Ezel
 Highlander (Bengali dubbed drama series; shown daily)
 Kadın (title localized as Bahar)
 Muhteşem Yüzyıl (title localized as Sultan Suleiman)
 Muhteşem Yüzyıl: Kösem (title localized as Sultan Suleiman Kosem)
 The Powerpuff Girls

Programmes (specials and documentaries)
 Operation Kilo Flight, a documentary on Bir Uttom Shamsul Alam; first broadcast on Bijoy Dibosh (National Victory Day), 16 December 2015
 1971, a series documentary on The War of Independence of Bangladesh, broadcast on 5pm daily from 1 March 2016 to 26 March 2016
 Frutika Islamic Genius, new generation's authentic Islamic knowledge based 30-episode Ramadan reality show, broadcast on 5pm daily from 6 June 2016 to 5 July 2016.

References

External links 

 

Television in Bangladesh
Television channels and stations established in 2015
Mass media in Dhaka
Television channels in Bangladesh
2015 establishments in Bangladesh